The Truest Shit I Ever Said is the fifth studio album by American rapper C-Murder, released on March 22, 2005, on TRU Records and Koch Records. The album was recorded in prison, during visiting hours using a hand held recorder supplied by his lawyer and released on Tru Records. The intro to the album contains audio from interviews with family and friends about him going to jail.

Background
The outro is a dedication to his late fellow rapper Soulja Slim, who had been murdered two years earlier. Slim is featured in "Holla at Me". Incarcerated rapper, Mac appears on the track "Camouflage & Murder" Produced by Donald XL Robertson. Mac was serving time for murder, when the song was recorded. The track "Won't Let Me Out" is a remix of Akon's hit single "Locked Up". The album achieved moderate success due to its lead single "My Life", which was also made into a video and the surprisingly successful hit "Y'all Heard of Me" with fellow New Orleans rapper B.G.

Track listing
"Intro" 1:53
"My Life 3:51
"Skit" 0:20
"Stressin'" 3:21
"Won't Let Me Out" 4:01
"Hustla's Wife" (featuring Junie Bezel) 3:25
"Holla at Me" (featuring Soulja Slim) 4:19
"Skit" 0:15
"Y'all Heard of Me" (featuring B.G.) 4:43
"Betta Watch Me" (featuring Fiend & Popeye) 4:24
"Did U Hold It Down" (featuring Bass Heavy) 4:36
"I Heard U Was Lookin' 4 Me" (featuring Montez & Capone) 4:19
"Back Up" 4:05
"Camouflage & Murder" (featuring Mac & Curren$y) 2:35
"Started Small Time" 3:06
"Mama How You Figure" (featuring Ms. Peaches) 3:27
"Outro" 0:45

Chart positions

References

C-Murder albums
2005 albums
E1 Music albums
Albums produced by Akon